Santiago Wilson Osmund De Silva  (25 December 1909 - c. 1980) was Ceylonese police officer. He was the thirteenth and the first Ceylonese career police officer to become Inspector-General of Police (1955–1959).

Early life and education 
Santiago Wilson Osmund De Silva was born on 25 December 1909 the son of Mudliyar Thomas de Silva, founding principal of Dharmasoka College. He was educated at S. Thomas' College, Mount Lavinia and University College, Colombo,

Police career 
De Silva joined the Ceylon Police Force as a Probationary Assistant Superintendent of Police on appointment by the Governor in December 1931. Following the completion of his service examinations, he was appointed Assistant Superintendent of Police of Avissawella in December 1933 and went on to serve in Sabaragamuwa and again in Avissawella before attending the senior police officers course at the Metropolitan Police in 1936. On his return he served as Assistant Superintendent of Police in Kurunegala, Kegalle, Police Training School. In May 1943, he was promoted to Superintendent of Police and served in the Southern Proving, Police Training School, Northern Province, North-Western Province, Central Province. He was promoted Acting Deputy Inspector General of Police (DIG) in 1949 serving as DIG Administration, DIG Range II; during which time he served as the Superintendent of Police, Police Headquarters. He was appointed a Member of the Order of the British Empire (MBE) in the 1953 Coronation Honours and Officer (OBE) in the 1954 Birthday Honours. He had been awarded the Ceylon Police Medal for Meritorious Service, Defence Medal 1939-45, Ceylon Police Independence Medal and the Service Medal of the Order of St John.

Inspector General of Police 
In 1955 de Silva succeeded his father-in-law, Sir Richard Aluwihare to be appointed as Inspector General of Police (IGP). He became the first IGP appointed from within the police force and the first Buddhist. De Silva was responsible for introducing community policing to the country, a vision that was not shared by his successors. In 1959 the Prime Minister of Ceylon, S. W. R. D. Bandaranaike requested that the police intervene against trade union action occurring at Colombo Harbour. De Silva declined to do the Prime Minister’s bidding on the basis that he believed the request was unlawful. On 24 April 1959, de Silva was compulsorily retired from the police force and M. Walter F. Abeykoon, a civil servant, was appointed in his place.

Family 
In 1941, he married Ena Aluvihare, the nineteen year old daughter of the civil servant Richard Aluwihare, who would become the first Ceylonese Inspector General of Police in 1947.

References

Sri Lankan Inspectors General of Police
Sri Lankan Buddhists
Alumni of S. Thomas' College, Mount Lavinia
Alumni of the Ceylon University College
People from British Ceylon
Ceylonese Officers of the Order of the British Empire
1909 births

1980 deaths
Osmund